Reece Ritchie (born 23 July 1986) is an English actor. He is known for his film roles, such as Moha in 10,000 BC (2008), Bis in Prince of Persia: The Sands of Time (2010), and Iolaus in Hercules (2014). He starred as Jay in the British drama television series White Heat (2012). He played Zed in American fantasy-adventure television series, The Outpost (2019–2021), and stars as Lt. Spencer Lane in the American sci-fi television series, The Ark (2023).

Early life
Ritchie was born in Lowestoft, Suffolk, England. He has described himself as a "mix", as his father is from Durban, South Africa and his mother is English. His paternal grandparents left South Africa for England when his father was only a year old because of apartheid in South Africa. Ritchie is the middle of three children. His younger sister is singer-songwriter Ria Ritchie. He worked with the National Youth Theatre as a teenager, and furthered his acting education at the East 15 Acting School at the University of Essex in Loughton, Essex.

Career

After being spotted by a casting director during one of his monologue performances at the Soho Theatre in London, Ritchie was suggested for a role in director Roland Emmerich's 2008 epic 10,000 BC, in which he played the role of Moha. In Peter Jackson's 2009 film The Lovely Bones (based on Alice Sebold's novel of the same name), Ritchie played Ray Singh, the love interest of the main character, Susie Salmon.

In February and March 2010, he starred as Puck in A Midsummer Night's Dream at the Rose Theatre, Kingston with Judi Dench.

In 2013, it was announced that Ritchie would have a starring role in the 2015 television series Hieroglyph, to be produced by 20th Century Fox TV, but Fox dropped the production in June 2014. Ritchie has starred alongside Dwayne Johnson in the 2014 film Hercules. Ritchie played the role of Hercules' nephew Iolaus, a storyteller and soldier.

In 2023, Ritchie stars as Lt. Spencer Lane in the American sci-fi television series The Ark which airs on Syfy. The series premiered on February 1, 2023. Ritchie appears alongside co-stars Christie Burke and Richard Fleeshman.

Filmography

Film

Television

References

External links

1986 births
Alumni of East 15 Acting School
English male film actors
English male stage actors
English male television actors
English people of South African descent
Living people
National Youth Theatre members
People from Lowestoft
Male actors from Suffolk